DVV Media Group is a global publishing company which publishes books and magazines about transport and logistic topics. In 2013, Rheinische Post Mediengruppe became the sole shareholder of DVV. In 2005, Verlagsgruppe Handelsblatt joined the DVV Group as a strategic investor, taking over some of the shares held by the heirs of the founders of the publishing house.

Selected publications
 Air Cargo News
 Commercial Motor
 Flight International
 Metro Report International
 Rail Business UK
 Railway Gazette International

References

External links 
 

Academic publishing companies
Pan-European media companies
Book publishing companies of Germany
Publishing companies of Germany
Mass media in Hamburg